Hairo is a village of Tehsil Jampur, Union Council Kotla Dewan Rajanpur District. It is located 15 km southeast of Jampur near the Kotla Mughlan. About 1000 years ago there was a city. The Indus River washed all the city away, and it remained flooded for about 25 years. Once again in July 2010 Hairo was included in flooded area. The Government of Pakistan and Pakistan Army attempted to help the people affected by the 2010 flood. Mostly, the people speak Saraiki and Balochi.

Flood 2010 
In July 2010 Hairo was hit by flood, which causes emigration of inhabitants to dry areas. Pakistan Army helped the affected people. The flood caused many economic problems for the people there. The Government of Pakistan provided the Watan Card for the flood. Food and water also provided by the government to the people.

Education
Here are five primary schools and one middle school recently opened in 2006.

Economy
Mostly these people depends upon agriculture products such as tobacco, wheat, cotton. Due to location near the river it is also known for cattle and buffalo. There is a big delta in the Indus River and it is a green grazing place for animals.

See also
Punjab (Pakistan)
Pakistan
Dera Ghazi Khan
Kotla Mughlan

References 

Populated places in Rajanpur District